Mikhail Alexeyevich Matinsky (1750 – c. 1820) was a Russian scientist, dramatist, librettist and opera composer.

Biography
Matinsky originated from the serfs of Count Sergey Yaguzhinsky and was born in Pavlovskoe.  He studied in the gymnasium for the "raznochintsy" (people not belonging to the gentry) at Moscow University and also in Italy. Later he taught mathematics at the Smolny Institute of Noble Maidens in Saint Petersburg. He published the following books:  The Description of Measures and Weights of Different Countries (Saint Petersburg 1779), The Fundamentals of Geometry (Saint Petersburg 1798), and The Concise Universal Geography (Saint Petersburg 1800). He also translated the comedy The Churchwoman by Christian Fürchtegott Gellert, and the same author's Fables and Tales, as well as The Republic of the Scientists by S. Fayard.  He died in Saint Petersburg.

Operas
His creative output also included comedies, opera librettos, and even music set to them. His operas Regeneration (Перерождение, 1777), and Saint-Petersburg's Trade Stalls (Санкт Петербургский Гостный Двор) had considerable success. The second one, a scathing satire to the government officials and their thievish behaviour, is one of the first examples of Russian comic opera. It was staged on December 26, 1779 at the Knipper Theatre in St Petersburg and was repeated 16 times. Later the music was rewritten by a composer Vasily Pashkevich in 1882 and 1792. In a new version the opera was also staged at the Court Theatre.

Pashkevich’s Operas to Matinsky’s librettos

Saint-Petersburg's Trade Stalls (Санкт Петербургский Гостиный Двор — Sankt Peterburgskiy Gostinyi Dvor, 1782 St. Petersburg)
The Pasha of Tunis (Паша Тунисский — Pasha tunisskiy, 1782)
As you live, so you will be judged (Как поживёшь, так и прослывёшь — Kak pozhivyosh', tak i proslyvyosh,  1792 St. Petersburg) — revision of Saint-Petersburg's Trade Stalls

See also
Russian opera
Russian opera articles
Karl Knipper Theatre
Vasily Pashkevich
Gostiny Dvor

Bibliography
Warrack, John and West, Ewan: The Concise Oxford Dictionary of Opera 1996
Prokofiev, Vsevolod Alexandrovich: Mikhail Matinsky and his opera Saint-Petersburg's Trade Stalls (Михаил Матинский и его опера "Санктпетер-бургский Гостиный Двор", в кн.: Музыка и музыкальный быт старой России, т. 1, Ленинград, 1927, с. 58-69;)
Russian Comedy and Comic Opera in the 18th century (Русская комедия и комическая опера XVIII века. Ред. текста и вступ. ст. П. Н. Беркова, М.-Л., 1950)
 Rabinovich A. S.: Russian Opera Before Glinka (Рабинович А. С., Русская опера до Глинки, [М. ], 1948)
 History of Russian Music (История русской музыки в нотных образцах, под ред. С. Л. Гинзбурга, т. 1, Л. - М., 1940)
 Bokshchanina E. A.: About National Features of the Language and Dramaturgy of Matinsky’s opera Saint-Petersburg's Trade Stalls   (Бокщанина Е. А., О народности музыкального языка и особенности драматургии оперы М. Матинского "Санкт-Петербургский Гостиный двор". ."Тр. Гос. музыкально-педагогического института им. Гнесиных", 1959, вып. 1, с. 134.)

Notes

External links
CD information
The Concise Oxford Dictionary of Opera on line
Short biography in Russian
Theatrical Encyclopaedia (in Russian)

Russian opera librettists
Russian opera composers
Male opera composers
Russian male classical composers
Russian dramatists and playwrights
Russian male dramatists and playwrights
18th-century mathematicians from the Russian Empire
Russian serfs
1750 births
1820s deaths